Thomas Stratos (born 9 October 1966) is a German-Greek football coach and a former player.

Career statistics 
As of 25 October 2022

References

1966 births
Living people
German footballers
Bundesliga players
2. Bundesliga players
Arminia Bielefeld players
Hamburger SV players
1. FC Saarbrücken players
FC Gütersloh 2000 players
German football managers
FC Gütersloh 2000 managers
SSV Jahn Regensburg managers
Berliner FC Dynamo managers
3. Liga managers
Association football defenders
Association football midfielders
German people of Greek descent
German expatriate sportspeople in Saudi Arabia
German expatriate sportspeople in Greece